Great Southern Land is the first compilation album by Australian rock/synthpop band Icehouse, released by Chrysalis Records / Regular Records in October 1989. It peaked at No. 2 on the Australian albums charts, and contained two new singles "Touch the Fire", which peaked at No. 13 on the singles chart, and "Jimmy Dean", which peaked at No. 47. Several different versions of this album exist; the Regular Records release for Australian / New Zealand markets was as a 16 track double vinyl LP, twin music cassette or CD; Chrysalis Records US versions were as 10 track LP / music cassette or 11 track CD release with a different track order; Chrysalis Records UK versions had 12 tracks (some not included on original Australian release); and a video version of 15 tracks was released in VHS PAL format.

Track listing

Australian/New Zealand release
 "Touch the Fire"
 "Can't Help Myself"
 "Hey Little Girl"
 "Great Southern Land"
 "Paradise"
 "Sister"
 "No Promises"
 "Jimmy Dean"
 "Cross the Border"
 "Street Cafe"
 "Love in Motion"
 "Walls"
 "Baby, You're So Strange"
 "We Can Get Together"
 "Mr. Big"
 "Don't Believe Anymore"

American release
 "Touch the Fire"
 "Jimmy Dean"
 "Hey Little Girl"
 "Can't Help Myself"
 "Great Southern Land"
 "Sister"
 "Cross the Border"
 "We Can Get Together"
 "Street Cafe"
 "Don't Believe Anymore"
 "No Promises" (12" Dance Mix) (**)

(**) Only released on CD version, not Cassette.

UK release
 "Touch the Fire"
 "Jimmy Dean"
 "Hey Little Girl"
 "Great Southern Land"
 "Electric Blue"
 "Crazy"
 "Cross the Border"
 "Street Cafe"
 "Don't Believe Anymore"
 "No Promises" (12" Dance Mix)
 "Sister"
 "Icehouse"

Video release
 "Can't Help Myself"
 "We Can Get Together"
 "Walls"
 "Sister"
 "Love in Motion"
 "Great Southern Land '82"
 "Hey Little Girl"
 "Street Cafe"
 "Don't Believe Anymore"
 "No Promises"
 "Baby, You're So Strange"
 "Mr. Big"
 "Cross the Border"
 "Touch the Fire"
 "Great Southern Land '89"

Released in VHS/PAL format.

Personnel
Icehouse members
Iva Davies — vocals, guitars, keyboards
Robert Kretschmer — guitar
Simon Lloyd — saxophone, keyboards
Stephen Morgan — bass guitar
Paul Wheeler — drums

Art work
Cover photography — Hugh McLeod-Aitionn
Cover artwork — Hugh McLeod-Aitionn
Band photos —Jan Moxley & Tony Mott

Charts

Certifications

References

1989 compilation albums
Icehouse (band) albums
Chrysalis Records compilation albums
Compilation albums by Australian artists